Kendrick Green (born December 22, 1998) is an American football guard for the Pittsburgh Steelers of the National Football League (NFL). He played college football at Illinois and was drafted by the Steelers in the third round of the 2021 NFL Draft.

Early life and high school
Green grew up in Peoria, Illinois and attended Peoria High School, where he was a member of the baseball, football, and wrestling teams. Green was named first-team All-State as a senior after recording 113 tackles, including 33 for a loss, 15 sacks and four forced fumbles as Peoria won the 2016 IHSA 5A state championship. Green committed to play college football at Illinois over an offer from Iowa.

College career
Green redshirted his true freshman season and moved from defensive tackle to offensive line. Green started all 12 of the Illini's games at left guard as a redshirt freshman. He started all of Illinois' games at left guard again in his redshirt sophomore season and was named honorable mention All-Big Ten Conference as well as an honorable mention All-American by Pro Football Focus. As a redshirt junior, Green started three games at center and five games at guard in the COVID-19 shortened 2020 Big Ten season and was named first-team All-Big Ten and a second-team All-American by USA Today. Following the end of the season, Green declared that he would forgo his redshirt senior season and enter the 2021 NFL draft.

Professional career

Green was drafted by the Pittsburgh Steelers in the third round, 87th overall, of the 2021 NFL Draft. On July 20, 2021, Green signed his four-year rookie contract with Pittsburgh.

2021 season: Rookie year

Heading into OTAs and his first NFL training camp, Green was listed as the starting center for the Steelers on their training camp depth chart. He faced minor competition from veteran J. C. Hassenauer for his starting job.  At the conclusion of the NFL preseason, head coach Mike Tomlin officially named Green the Steelers' starting center.

Green made his first career start and NFL debut in the Steelers' Week 1 victory over the Buffalo Bills.  He played in 95% of the offensive snaps in that game, 100% of the offensive snaps in Week 2, and 89% of the offensive snaps in Week 3.  Green would play 100% of the Steelers' offensive snaps in every game from Weeks 4-15 and 63% of the offensive snaps in the Steelers' Week 16 loss to the Kansas City Chiefs.  In that game, he suffered an injury that ultimately kept him out of the final two games of the season.  

Overall, Green finished his rookie season appearing in 15 games (15 starts), playing in 96% of the Steelers' offensive snaps on the season and posting a 53.1 grade from Pro Football Focus.  He committed 6 penalties total, including 4 holding penalties, in what was an overall rough rookie season.

2022 season
The Steelers moved Green from center to guard in his second season. He competed in the preseason with Kevin Dotson for the starting left guard position, but Dotson prevailed.

Green spent the entire season on the active roster, but was inactive for all 17 games.

References

External links 
Illinois Fighting Illini bio

Living people
American football centers
Illinois Fighting Illini football players
Players of American football from Illinois
Sportspeople from Peoria, Illinois
Pittsburgh Steelers players
1998 births